Velike Pece (in older sources also Velike Peče) is a village in the Municipality of Ivančna Gorica in central Slovenia. The A2 Slovenian motorway runs just north of the settlement core. The area is part of the historical region of Lower Carniola. The municipality is now included in the Central Slovenia Statistical Region.

Church

The local church is dedicated to Our Lady of the Snows and belongs to the Parish of Šentvid pri Stični. It is originally a Gothic building, first mentioned in written documents dating to 1642 and heavily remodelled in the 17th and 18th centuries.

References

External links

Velike Pece on Geopedia

Populated places in the Municipality of Ivančna Gorica